Super noire is a collection of crime fiction, subsidiary of the Série noire, published by Éditions Gallimard from July 1974 to April 1979. Unlike books of the Série noire of the time, the covers of the Super noire are illustrated with a black and white photograph.

This series includes 134 volumes.

List of titles

Bibliography 
 .  Les Années Série Noire vol.4 (1972-1982) Encrage “ Travaux ” , 1995.

External links 
 Collection Super Noire on Editions Gallimard

Detective novels